Lalom (also Romanized as Lālom) is a village in Ziabar Rural District, in the Central District of Sowme'eh Sara County, Gilan Province, Iran. At the 2006 census, its population was 418, in 126 families.

References 

Populated places in Sowme'eh Sara County